Timpson Creek is a stream in the U.S. state of Georgia. It flows into Lake Burton.

A variant name is "Timson Creek". The creek is named after John Timson, a Cherokee Indian who settled near its banks.

References

Rivers of Georgia (U.S. state)
Rivers of Rabun County, Georgia